Kendra Ohama (January 6, 1965) is a Canadian retired wheelchair basketball player. As a member of Team Canada, she won three gold medals and one bronze during the Paralympic Games.

Early life
Ohama was born in Brooks, Alberta on January 6, 1965.

Career
After becoming paralyzed from the waist down at the age of 16 following a car accident, Ohama was approached a Calgary Grizzlies player in a store who convinced her to play the sport. She was eventually invited to tryout for the Canada women's national wheelchair basketball team in 1989. Ohama made her senior debut at the 1992 Summer Paralympics, where Team Canada won gold. She also won gold at the 1996 and 2000 Paralympic Games and bronze at the 2004 Summer Paralympics. Ohama was later named to Team Canada's roster for the 2008 Osaka Cup in Japan.

In March 2011, Ohama was named to Team Canada's National Team to compete at the 2011 Parapan American Games. Although the Calgary Rollers finished in third place, she was selected as a Tournament All-Star. In June, Ohama was awarded a $5,000 Team Investors Group Amateur Athletes Fund bursary. The next year, Ohama was selected to compete at the 2012 Summer Paralympics. On December 22, 2012, Ohama announced her retirement from the Canadian women's wheelchair basketball team. After retiring, she became a goldsmith at a family-run business called "The Goldsmiths."

References 

Living people
1965 births
Paralympic gold medalists for Canada
Sportspeople from Alberta
Basketball people from Alberta
People from Brooks, Alberta
Paralympic bronze medalists for Canada
Canadian women's wheelchair basketball players
Goldsmiths
Paralympic medalists in wheelchair basketball
Medalists at the 1992 Summer Paralympics
Medalists at the 1996 Summer Paralympics
Medalists at the 2000 Summer Paralympics
Medalists at the 2004 Summer Paralympics
Wheelchair basketball players at the 1992 Summer Paralympics
Wheelchair basketball players at the 1996 Summer Paralympics
Wheelchair basketball players at the 2000 Summer Paralympics
Wheelchair basketball players at the 2004 Summer Paralympics
Paralympic wheelchair basketball players of Canada